Coleophora leucaula is a moth of the family Coleophoridae. It is found in South Africa.

References

Endemic moths of South Africa
leucaula
Moths described in 1911
Moths of Africa